Soulforce Revolution is an album by hardcore punk band 7 Seconds. It was released by Restless Records in 1989, and peaked at #153 on the Billboard charts.

The album featured a slower, more melodic punk sound.

Track listing 
All songs written by Kevin Seconds. 
 "Satyagraha" - 3:09
 "Busy Little People" - 3:27
 "I Can Sympathize" - 2:45
 "It All Makes Less Sense Now" - 3:24
 "Mother's Day" - 4:15
 "Tribute Freedom Landscape" - 2:52
 "Copper Ledge" - 2:08
 "Tickets to a Better Place" - 2:23
 "4 A.M. in Texas" - 3:18
 "Soul to Keep (For Phillis)" - 3:34
 "Swansong" - 1:53

Personnel

Kevin Seconds: Lead Vocals 
Chris Carnahan: Guitar, Vocals 
Troy Mowat: Drums 
Steve Youth: Bass, Piano

References

1989 albums
7 Seconds (band) albums